Horigome (written: 堀米 or 堀籠) is a Japanese surname. Notable people with the surname include:

, Japanese cross-country skier
, Japanese sprinter
, Japanese footballer
, Japanese judge
Yuto Horigome (disambiguation), multiple people
, Japanese classical violinist, laureate 1980 of the Queen Elisabeth Competition

See also
Horigome Station, a railway station in Sano, Tochigi Prefecture, Japan

Japanese-language surnames